Frank Rijken (born 24 November 1996) is a Dutch male artistic gymnast and a member of the national team. He participated at the 2015 World Artistic Gymnastics Championships in Glasgow, and qualified for the 2016 Summer Olympics.

References

External links 
 

1996 births
Living people
Dutch male artistic gymnasts
People from Westvoorne
Gymnasts at the 2016 Summer Olympics
Olympic gymnasts of the Netherlands
European Games competitors for the Netherlands
Gymnasts at the 2015 European Games
Sportspeople from South Holland
20th-century Dutch people
21st-century Dutch people